Andreyevsky is a rural locality (a khutor) in Alexandrovsky Selsoviet, Meleuzovsky District, Bashkortostan, Russia. The population was 26 as of 2010. There are 3 streets.

Geography 
Andreyevsky is located 48 km northeast of Meleuz (the district's administrative centre) by road. Nizhnetashevo is the nearest rural locality.

References 

Rural localities in Meleuzovsky District